The James Noyes House is a historic First Period house at 7 Parker Street in Newbury, Massachusetts, United States.  The house was built by the Reverend James Noyes, a Puritan pastor, who settled in Newbury in the mid-17th century. The Noyes family came from Wiltshire in England. The house dates from about 1646. It was added to the National Register of Historic Places in 1990.

The main block of the house is a -story wood-frame structure, five bays wide, with a large central chimney.  When the house was first built, it was only a single room deep; around 1800 a -story cross-gable ell was added to the rear, which was further extended by a -story ell later in the 19th century.  The interior rooms of the main block have Federal period styling, probably dating to the time of the first addition.

See also
List of the oldest buildings in Massachusetts
National Register of Historic Places listings in Essex County, Massachusetts

References

Houses completed in 1646
Houses in Newbury, Massachusetts
Houses on the National Register of Historic Places in Essex County, Massachusetts
1646 establishments in Massachusetts
Noyes family
First period houses in Massachusetts (1620–1659)